Portrait of Bishop Antonius Triest and His Brother Eugene, a Capuchin is an oil on canvas painting by David Teniers the Younger., created in 1652, now in the Hermitage Museum, in Saint Petersburg, to which it was transferred from Boris Alekseevich Kurakin's collection.

To the right is Antoine Triest, who had been made Bishop of Bruges in 1617 and Bishop of Ghent in 1622. He was also a noted art collector and arts patron and bought works from Teniers and other Flemish painters. He is shown in prayer holding a rosary. To the left his brother, a Capuchin Friar, holds up a shield showing the five wounds of Christ, whilst the shelf in the background bears statuettes of Penitent St Jerome and Flagellation of Christ.

References

1652 paintings
17th-century portraits
Paintings by David Teniers the Younger
Paintings in the collection of the Hermitage Museum